Miño (Miñu) is one of 44 parishes (administrative divisions) in Tineo, a municipality within the province and autonomous community of Asturias, in northern Spain.

It has a population of 209.

Villages and hamlets
Bisl.lavera
La Fanar
La Fouz
Miñu
Santolaya
Tarantiel.los
La Tiera
Tremáu
Trespandu
Yerbu
Zreicéu'l Monte

References

Parishes in Tineo